The 2022 Kennesaw State Owls football team represented the Kennesaw State University as a new member of the ASUN Conference during the 2022 NCAA Division I FCS football season. Led by eighth-year head coach Brian Bohannon, the Owls played their home games at the Fifth Third Bank Stadium in Kennesaw, Georgia.

Previous season

The Owls finished the 2021 season with 11–2 overall record, 7–0 in Big South conference play to win the Big South title. They received an automatic bid to the FCS Playoffs where, where they defeated Davidson in the first round, before losing to East Tennessee State in the second round.

Schedule

Game summaries

at Samford

at Cincinnati

Wofford

at Jacksonville State

North Alabama

Central Arkansas

Tennessee Tech

Charleston Southern

at No. 20 UT Martin

Austin Peay

at Eastern Kentucky

References

Kennesaw State Owls
Kennesaw State Owls football seasons
Kennesaw State Owls football